Donald Max "Ab" Justice (January 23, 1934 – October 7, 2013) was an American professional golfer.

Justice played college at Oklahoma State University, where he was the school's first All-American. He enjoyed a brief stint on the PGA Tour, and was the club pro at various golf courses in Oklahoma and Kansas.

He died in 2013, aged 79.

References

External links

American male golfers
Oklahoma State Cowboys golfers
Golfers from Oklahoma
Sportspeople from Oklahoma City
1934 births
2013 deaths